Statistics of Primera División de México in season 1905-06.

Overview
In Mexico, the 1905-06 season saw the first club from the capital - Reforma Athletic Club- win the Mexican championship. This club, though dominated by Brits, did also allow native players. It was remarkable that in 20 league matches there were 16 where at last one or both sides failed to score. Champions Reforma had two excellent full-backs in the brothers Robert and Charles Blackmore, while most of their goals were not scored by a forward but by right half-back Charles Butlin. Mexico Cricket Club, which had changed name to San Pedro Golf Club, were runners-up.

Reforma 1905-06  Champion Squad

England
 Thomas R. Phillips(C)
 Morton S. Turner
 Robert J. Blackmore
 Charles Blackmore
 Charles M. Butlin
 Ebenezer Johnson
 Charles D. Gibson
 Robert Locke
 Thomas R. Phillips
 Paul M. Bennett
 Thomas R. Phillips (Manager)

Mexico
 Julio Lacaud
 Vicente Etchegaray

France
  Edward Bourchier

League standings

Top goalscorers
Players sorted first by goals scored, then by last name.

References

Mexico - List of final tables (RSSSF)

1905-06
Mex
1905–06 in Mexican football